Heinrich von Wild or Heinrich Wild I (1833–1902) was a Swiss meteorologist and physicist who established a modern meteorological system throughout the Russian empire and developed meteorological instruments.

Biography
He was born on 17 December 1833 at Uster (Canton Zurich), and was educated at Zurich, Königsberg, and Heidelberg. In 1858 he was appointed professor of physics and director of the observatory at Bern. In 1868 he was called to Saint Petersburg, where he completely reorganized the observatory and established a meteorological system throughout the Empire and founded the meteorological observatories at Pavlovsk and Irkutsk. Until his retirement in 1895 he remained in the service of the Russian government.

Alexey Krylov, who became the director of the Observatory in 1916, studied Wild's archive and wrote in his memoir about Wild's scientific achievements, management style, and frictions with the petty Russian bureaucracy.  "Wild was a man of great learning and extraordinary industriousness. He left an enormous quantity of computational works; apparently, he wanted to derive general laws from the massive volume of observations. He subjected these observations to harmonic analysis with annual and daily periods for a given location and attempted to apply expansions in spherical harmonics to different locations, similar to what Gauss did in relation to terrestrial magnetism. He built original and most accurate magnetic devices, stationary for the magnetic observatory in Pavlovsk and portable for magnetic surveys.

He strictly monitored the employees’ work. From each year of his administration, bound notebooks survived titled Berichte des Smotritels (Supervisors’ Accounts) and Tagebuch (Diary). Browsing through Berichte des Smotritels, I noticed Wild’s comment, “See correspondence with the state controller.” It turned out that on the occasion of a severe winter, stored firewood was not sufficient, and the supervisor asked permission to buy firewood out of the amount marked for another paragraph in the budget. By accounting rules, it was permissible to transfer amounts from one article to another, but to transfer amounts from one paragraph to another was not. Apparently not knowing this rule, Wild gave his permission. The Control ordered to recover unauthorized expenditure from him. Hence, the correspondence began.

Being in the Russian Civil Service with the rank of a privy councilor and the title of academician, the Swiss citizen Heinrich Wild wrote a letter to the Swiss ambassador, asking for protection from the cavils of the State Control and an insult (offense) to his dignity by the imposition of a fine (amende) on him. The Swiss ambassador notified Wild that he sent a protest to the State Control through the Ministry of Foreign Affairs, a copy of this protest being enclosed. Most surprising, the State Control sent a letter of apology in French through the Ministry of Foreign Affairs, saying that the recovery (pénalité) was not a fine (amende), was imposed by unfortunate misunderstanding, and was removed." Krylov includes several anecdotes of this sort.
Wild was elected a member of the Royal Swedish Academy of Sciences in 1891. He died at Zurich on 5 September

Inventions

He invented the polaristrobometer—a form of saccharimeter—a polarization  photometer, a magnetic theodolite, and various new optical methods for comparing measures of length.

Writing
Many of his papers were published in the Annalem des physikalischen Observatoriums für Russland and the Neues Repertorium für Meteorologie, founded by himself in 1865 and 1869 respectively; and also in the Mitteilungen of the International Polar Commission, of which he was president (1882–83). He published, furthermore, the great work Temperaturverhältnisse des russischen Reichs (Temperature Conditions in the Russian Empire, tables, atlas, etc., 1876; German and Russian).

References

External links

 

Swiss writers
19th-century Swiss inventors
Swiss physicists
Swiss meteorologists
Members of the Royal Swedish Academy of Sciences
Full members of the Saint Petersburg Academy of Sciences
Honorary members of the Saint Petersburg Academy of Sciences
1833 births
1902 deaths
Privy Councillor (Russian Empire)